Mersin İdmanyurdu (also Mersin İdman Yurdu, Mersin İY, or MİY) Sports Club; located in Mersin, east Mediterranean coast of Turkey in 1979–80. At the end of 1979–80 season Mersin İdmanyurdu has promoted to First League for the third time. The 1979–80 was the eighth season of Mersin İdmanyurdu (MİY) football team in Second League, the second level division in Turkey. They finished 1st in Group A. They have lost second league championship game against Kocaelispor by penalties.

1979–80 Second League participation
In its 17th season (1979–80) Second League was played with 32 teams, 16 in two groups: Group A and Group B. Group winners promoted to First League 1980–81. Runners-up played a promotion game to determine the third club to be promoted to first league. No teams relegated because next year second and third leagues merged and third league abandoned. Mersin İY became 1st in Group A with 17 wins and 38 goals.

Results summary
Mersin İdmanyurdu (MİY) 1979–80 Second League Group A league summary:

Sources: 1979–80 Turkish Second Football League pages.

League table
Mersin İY's league performance in Second League Group A in 1979–80 season is shown in the following table.

Note: Won, drawn and lost points are 2, 1 and 0. F belongs to MİY and A belongs to corresponding team for both home and away matches. No relegation.

Results by round
Results of games MİY played in 1979–80 Second League Group A by rounds:

First half

Mid-season
In the mid-season, MİY played a jubilee match for captain İbrahim against Galatasaray on 13 January 1980 at Tevfik Sırrı Gür Stadium. İbrahim left jersey no. 9 to Mücellip on 10th minute.
 13.01.1980 - MİY-Galatasaray: 0–1.

Second half

Championship match
Mersin İdmanyurdu lost the second league championship game against Kocaelispor, the Group B's winner.

1979–80 Turkish Cup participation
1979–80 Turkish Cup was played for the 18th season as Türkiye Kupası by 123 teams. First four elimination rounds were played in one-leg elimination system. Fifth and sixth elimination rounds and finals were played in two-legs elimination system. Mersin İdmanyurdu participated in 1979–80 Turkish Cup and was eliminated at round 3 by MKE Kırıkkalespor. Kırıkkalespor was eliminated at round 5. Altay won the Cup for the 2nd time and became eligible for 1981–82 European Cup Winners' Cup.

Cup track
The drawings and results Mersin İdmanyurdu (MİY) followed in 1979–80 Turkish Cup are shown in the following table.

Note: In the above table 'Score' shows For and Against goals whether the match played at home or not.

Game details
Mersin İdmanyurdu (MİY) 1979–80 Turkish Cup game reports is shown in the following table.
Kick off times are in EET and EEST.

Source: 1979–80 Turkish Cup pages.

Management

Club management
Hadi Doğan was club president.

Coaching team

1979–80 Mersin İdmanyurdu head coaches:

Note: Only official games were included.

1979–80 squad
Stats are counted for 1979–80 Second League matches and 1979–80 Turkish Cup (Türkiye Kupası) matches. In the team rosters five substitutes were allowed to appear, two of whom were substitutable. Only the players who appeared in game rosters were included and listed in the order of appearance.

Sources: 1979–80 season squad data from maçkolik com, Milliyet, and Cem Pekin Archives.

Transfer news from Milliyet:
 Transfers in: Raşit (Adana Demirspor).

MİY forward İbrahim ended his player career in the mid-season. In his jubilee match MİY lost to Galatasaray. This match was also a preparation match for the teams:
Mid season friendly game - 13.01.1980 - MİY-Galatasaray: 0-1. On 5th minute İbrahim left his place and jersey no. 9 to Mücellip.

See also
 Football in Turkey
 1979–80 Turkish Second Football League
 1979–80 Turkish Cup

Notes and references

Mersin İdman Yurdu seasons
Turkish football clubs 1979–80 season